
Gmina Łasin is an urban-rural gmina (administrative district) in Grudziądz County, Kuyavian-Pomeranian Voivodeship, in north-central Poland.

Villages
Apart from the town of Łasin, Gmina Łasin contains the villages and settlements of Bogdanki, Boże Pole, Goczałki, Gordanowo, Hermanowo, Huta-Strzelce, Jakubkowo, Jankowice, Kozłowo, Ludwichowo, Małe Szczepanki, Nogat, Nowe Błonowo, Nowe Jankowice, Nowe Mosty, Plesewo, Przesławice, Stare Błonowo, Święte, Szczepanki, Szonowo Królewskie, Szonowo Szlacheckie, Szynwałd, Szynwałdzik, Wybudowanie Łasińskie, Wydrzno, Zawda and Zawdzka Wola.

Neighbouring gminas
Gmina Łasin is bordered by the gminas of Biskupiec, Gardeja, Gruta, Kisielice, Rogóźno and Świecie nad Osą.

References
Polish official population figures 2006

Lasin
Grudziądz County